Coaches and media of the Big Ten Conference award the following individual honors at the end of each football season. In addition, the Chicago Tribune awards the Chicago Tribune Silver Football to the most valuable football player of the conference.

General

Player of the Year
Sanctioned by AP and UPI; replaced with separate offensive and defensive selections in 1990.
 1982: Anthony Carter, WR, Michigan
 1983: Don Thorp, DT, Illinois
 1984: Keith Byars, TB, Ohio State
 1985: Chuck Long, QB, Iowa and Lorenzo White, TB, Michigan State
 1986: Jim Harbaugh, QB, Michigan
 1987: Lorenzo White, TB, Michigan State and Ernie Jones, WR, Indiana
 1988: Anthony Thompson, TB, Indiana
 1989: Anthony Thompson, TB, Indiana (2)

Graham–George Offensive Player of the Year
Selected by coaches and media.  In 2011, the award was renamed the Graham–George Offensive Player of the Year Award in honor of Northwestern's Otto Graham and Ohio State's Eddie George.
 1990: Nick Bell, RB, Iowa (coaches), Matt Rodgers, QB, Iowa (coaches), Jon Vaughn, TB, Michigan (coaches), and Tico Duckett, RB, Michigan State (media)
 1991: Desmond Howard, SE, Michigan
 1992: Tyrone Wheatley, RB, Michigan
 1993: Brent Moss, RB, Wisconsin
 1994: Kerry Collins, QB, Penn State
 1995: Eddie George, RB, Ohio State
 1996: Orlando Pace, OT, Ohio State
 1997: Curtis Enis, RB, Penn State (coaches) and Tavian Banks, RB, Iowa (media)
 1998: Joe Germaine, QB, Ohio State (coaches) and Drew Brees, QB, Purdue (media)
 1999: Ron Dayne, RB, Wisconsin
 2000: Drew Brees, QB, Purdue
 2001: Antwaan Randle El, QB, Indiana
 2002: Brad Banks, QB, Iowa
 2003: Chris Perry, RB, Michigan
 2004: Braylon Edwards, WR, Michigan
 2005: Michael Robinson, QB, Penn State (coaches) and Brett Basanez, QB, Northwestern (media)
 2006: Troy Smith, QB, Ohio State
 2007: Rashard Mendenhall, RB, Illinois
 2008: Shonn Greene, RB, Iowa
 2009: John Clay, RB, Wisconsin
 2010: Denard Robinson, QB, Michigan
 2011: Montee Ball, RB, Wisconsin
 2012: Braxton Miller, QB, Ohio State
 2013: Braxton Miller, QB, Ohio State (2)
 2014: Melvin Gordon, RB, Wisconsin
 2015: Ezekiel Elliott, RB, Ohio State
 2016: Saquon Barkley, RB, Penn State
 2017: Saquon Barkley, RB, Penn State (2)
 2018: Dwayne Haskins, QB, Ohio State
 2019: Justin Fields, QB, Ohio State
 2020: Justin Fields, QB, Ohio State (2)
 2021: C. J. Stroud, QB, Ohio State
 2022: C. J. Stroud, QB, Ohio State (2)

Nagurski–Woodson Defensive Player of the Year
Selected by coaches and media.  The award was renamed the Nagurski–Woodson Award in 2011 in honor of Minnesota's Bronko Nagurski and Michigan's Charles Woodson.
 1990: Moe Gardner, NT, Illinois (coaches) and Darrick Brownlow, LB, Illinois (media)
 1991: Leroy Smith, DE, Iowa (coaches) and Troy Vincent, CB, Wisconsin (media)
 1992: Steve Tovar, LB, Ohio State (coaches) and Jeff Zgonina, DT, Purdue (media)
 1993: Dana Howard, LB, Illinois and Dan Wilkinson, DT, Ohio State (media)
 1994: Dana Howard, Illinois (2)
 1995: Pat Fitzgerald, LB, Northwestern
 1996: Shawn Springs, CB, Ohio State (coaches) and Pat Fitzgerald, LB, Northwestern (media) (2)
 1997: Charles Woodson, CB, Michigan
 1998: LaVar Arrington, LB, Penn State (coaches) and Tom Burke, DL, Wisconsin (media)
 1999: Courtney Brown, DL, Penn State
 2000: Jamar Fletcher, DB, Wisconsin
 2001: Larry Foote, LB, Michigan
 2002: Mike Doss, DB, Ohio State (coaches) and Michael Haynes, DL, Penn State (media)
 2003: Will Smith, DE, Ohio State
 2004: Erasmus James, DE, Wisconsin
 2005: A. J. Hawk, LB, Ohio State
 2006: LaMarr Woodley, DE, Michigan
 2007: James Laurinaitis, LB, Ohio State
 2008: James Laurinaitis, LB, Ohio State (2)
 2009: Jared Odrick, DT, Penn State (coaches) and Greg Jones, LB, Michigan State (media)
 2010: Ryan Kerrigan, DE, Purdue
 2011: Devon Still, DT, Penn State
 2012: John Simon, DE, Ohio State
 2013: Chris Borland, LB, Wisconsin
 2014: Joey Bosa, DL, Ohio State
 2015: Carl Nassib, DL, Penn State
 2016: Jabrill Peppers, LB, Michigan
 2017: Josey Jewell, LB, Iowa
 2018: Devin Bush, LB, Michigan
 2019: Chase Young, DE, Ohio State
 2020: Daviyon Nixon, DT, Iowa
 2021: Aidan Hutchinson, DE, Michigan
 2022: Jack Campbell, LB, Iowa

Thompson–Randle El Freshman of the Year
Selected by coaches and media.  In 2011, the award was renamed the Thompson–Randle El Freshman of the Year Award in honor of Minnesota's Darrell Thompson and Indiana's Antwaan Randle El.
 1986: Darrell Thompson, TB, Minnesota (coaches)
 1987: Tony Lowery, QB, Wisconsin (coaches)
 1988: Brian Fox, QB, Purdue (coaches) and Ed Sutter, LB-P, Northwestern (media)
 1989: Eric Hunter, QB, Purdue
 1990: Robert Smith, TB, Ohio State
 1991: Corey Rogers, TB, Purdue
 1992: Korey Stringer, OT, Ohio State (coaches) and Simeon Rice, DL, Illinois (media)
 1993: Reggie Garnett, MLB, Michigan State
 1994: Orlando Pace, OT, Ohio State
 1995: Charles Woodson, DB, Michigan (coaches) and Curtis Enis, RB, Penn State (media)
 1996: Andy Katzenmoyer, LB, Ohio State and Ron Dayne, RB, Wisconsin (coaches)
 1997: Anthony Thomas, RB, Michigan
 1998: Antwaan Randle El, QB, Indiana
 1999: Brooks Bollinger, QB, Wisconsin
 2000: Stuart Schweigert, DB, Purdue
 2001: Anthony Davis, RB, Wisconsin
 2002: Maurice Clarett, RB, Ohio State
 2003: Laurence Maroney, RB, Minnesota and Steve Breaston, WR, Michigan (coaches)
 2004: Mike Hart, RB, Michigan
 2005: Tyrell Sutton, RB, Northwestern
 2006: P. J. Hill, RB, Wisconsin
 2007: Arrelious Benn, WR, Illinois
 2008: Terrelle Pryor, QB, Ohio State
 2009: Chris Borland, LB, Wisconsin
 2010: James White, RB, Wisconsin
 2011: Braxton Miller, QB, Ohio State
 2012: Deion Barnes, DE, Penn State
 2013: Christian Hackenberg, QB, Penn State
 2014: J. T. Barrett, QB, Ohio State
 2015: Jabrill Peppers, S/RB, Michigan
 2016: Mike Weber, RB, Ohio State
 2017: Jonathan Taylor, RB, Wisconsin
 2018: Rondale Moore, WR, Purdue
 2019: David Bell, WR, Purdue
 2020: Brandon Joseph, DB, Northwestern
 2021: C. J. Stroud, QB, Ohio State
 2022: Nicholas Singleton, RB, Penn State

Dave McClain / Hayes–Schembechler Coach of the Year
From 1986 through 2010, this award was dedicated in honor of Dave McClain, who served as the Wisconsin Badgers head coach from 1978 to 1985.  Recipients were selected by the media.  The coaches selected a separate award from 1982 to 1991. When the coaches resumed selecting a coach of the year in 2011, it was named for the first two recipients of the Big Ten Coach of the year, Bo Schembechler and Woody Hayes, as the Hayes–Schembechler coach of the year. 
 1972: Bo Schembechler, Michigan
 1973: Woody Hayes, Ohio State
 1974: Denny Stolz, Michigan State
 1975: Woody Hayes, Ohio State (2)
 1976: Bo Schembechler, Michigan (2)
 1977: Darryl Rogers, Michigan State
 1978: Jim Young, Purdue
 1979: Earle Bruce, Ohio State
 1980: Bo Schembechler, Michigan (3)
 1981: Hayden Fry, Iowa
 1982: Dennis Green, Northwestern (media) and Bo Schembechler, Michigan (coaches) (4)
 1983: Mike White, Illinois (media and coaches)
 1984: Leon Burtnett, Purdue (media and coaches)
 1985: Bo Schembechler, Michigan (media and coaches) (5)
 1986: Bill Mallory, Indiana (media and coaches)
 1987: Bill Mallory, Indiana (media) (2) and George Perles, Michigan State  (coaches)
 1988: John Mackovic, Illinois (media and coaches)
 1989: John Mackovic, Illinois (media) (2) and Bo Schembechler, Michigan (coaches) (6)
 1990: Hayden Fry, Iowa (media and coaches) (2) 
 1991: Gary Moeller, Michigan (media) and Hayden Fry, Iowa (coaches) (3)
 1992: Gary Moeller, Michigan (2)
 1993: Barry Alvarez, Wisconsin
 1994: Joe Paterno, Penn State
 1995: Gary Barnett, Northwestern
 1996: Gary Barnett, Northwestern (2)
 1997: Joe Tiller, Purdue
 1998: Barry Alvarez, Wisconsin (2)
 1999: Glen Mason, Minnesota
 2000: Randy Walker, Northwestern
 2001: Ron Turner, Illinois
 2002: Kirk Ferentz, Iowa
 2003: John L. Smith, Michigan State
 2004: Kirk Ferentz, Iowa (2)
 2005: Joe Paterno, Penn State (2)
 2006: Bret Bielema, Wisconsin
 2007: Ron Zook, Illinois
 2008: Joe Paterno, Penn State (3)
 2009: Kirk Ferentz, Iowa (3)
 2010: Mark Dantonio, Michigan State
 2011: Brady Hoke, Michigan (media and coaches)
 2012: Bill O'Brien, Penn State (media and coaches)
 2013: Mark Dantonio, Michigan State (media and coaches) (2)
 2014: Jerry Kill, Minnesota (media and coaches)
 2015: Kirk Ferentz, Iowa (media and coaches) (4)
 2016: James Franklin, Penn State (media) and Paul Chryst, Wisconsin (coaches)
 2017: Paul Chryst, Wisconsin (media and coaches) (2)
 2018: Pat Fitzgerald, Northwestern (media and coaches)
 2019: Ryan Day, Ohio State (media) and P. J. Fleck, Minnesota (coaches)
 2020: Tom Allen, Indiana (media and coaches)
 2021: Mel Tucker, Michigan State (media and coaches)
 2022: Jim Harbaugh, Michigan (media and coaches)

Ford–Kinnick Leadership Award
 2011: Archie Griffin, Ohio State
 2012: Jon Runyan Sr., Michigan
 2013: Gene Washington, Michigan State
 2014: Mike Hopkins, Illinois
 2015: Brian Griese, Michigan
 2016: Reggie McKenzie, Michigan
 2017: Troy Vincent, Wisconsin
 2018: Antwaan Randle El, Indiana
 2019: Doug Schlereth, Indiana
 2020: Napoleon Harris, Northwestern
 2021: Pat Richter, Wisconsin
 2022: Ron Guenther, Illinois

Dungy–Thompson Humanitarian Award
 2011: George Taliaferro, Indiana
 2012: Chris Spielman, Ohio State
 2013: Drew Brees, Purdue
 2014: Brian Griese, Michigan
 2015: John Shinsky, Michigan State
 2016: Trent Green, Indiana
 2017: Chad Greenway, Iowa
 2018: Jake Wood, Wisconsin
 2019: J. J. Watt, Wisconsin
 2020: Vincent Smith, Michigan
 2021: Malcolm Jenkins, Ohio State
 2022: Nate Sudfeld, Indiana

All-Big Ten

Offensive

Griese–Brees Quarterback of the Year
Award started in 2011, named in honor of Purdue's Bob Griese and Drew Brees.
 2011: Russell Wilson, Wisconsin
 2012: Braxton Miller, Ohio State
 2013: Braxton Miller, Ohio State (2)
 2014: J. T. Barrett, Ohio State
 2015: Connor Cook, Michigan State
 2016: J. T. Barrett, Ohio State (2)
 2017: J. T. Barrett, Ohio State (3)
 2018: Dwayne Haskins, Ohio State
 2019: Justin Fields, Ohio State
 2020: Justin Fields, Ohio State (2)
 2021: C. J. Stroud, Ohio State
 2022: C. J. Stroud, Ohio State (2)

Ameche–Dayne Running Back of the Year
Award started in 2011, named in honor of Wisconsin's Alan Ameche and Ron Dayne.
 2011: Montee Ball, Wisconsin
 2012: Montee Ball, Wisconsin (2)
 2013: Carlos Hyde, Ohio State
 2014: Melvin Gordon, Wisconsin
 2015: Ezekiel Elliott, Ohio State
 2016: Saquon Barkley, Penn State
 2017: Saquon Barkley, Penn State (2)
 2018: Jonathan Taylor, Wisconsin
 2019: Jonathan Taylor, Wisconsin (2)
 2020: Mohamed Ibrahim, Minnesota
 2021: Kenneth Walker III, Michigan State
 2022: Blake Corum, Michigan

Richter–Howard Receiver of the Year
Award began in 2011 and is named in honor of Wisconsin's Pat Richter and Michigan's Desmond Howard.
 2011: Marvin McNutt, Iowa
 2012: Allen Robinson, Penn State
 2013: Allen Robinson, Penn State (2)
 2014: Tony Lippett, Michigan State
 2015: Aaron Burbridge, Michigan State
 2016: Austin Carr, Northwestern
 2017: D. J. Moore, Maryland
 2018: Rondale Moore, Purdue
 2019: Rashod Bateman, Minnesota
 2020: Ty Fryfogle, Indiana
 2021: David Bell, Purdue
 2022: Marvin Harrison Jr., Ohio State

Kwalick–Clark Tight End of the Year
Award began in 2011 and is named in honor of Penn State's Ted Kwalick and Iowa's Dallas Clark.
 2011: Drake Dunsmore, Northwestern
 2012: Jacob Pedersen, Wisconsin
 2013: Devin Funchess, Michigan
 2014: Maxx Williams, Minnesota
 2015: Jake Butt, Michigan
 2016: Jake Butt, Michigan (2) 
 2017: Troy Fumagalli, Wisconsin
 2018: T. J. Hockenson, Iowa
 2019: Brycen Hopkins, Purdue
 2020: Pat Freiermuth, Penn State
 2021: Austin Allen, Nebraska
 2022: Sam LaPorta, Iowa

Rimington–Pace Offensive Lineman of the Year
Selected by Big Ten radio broadcasters until 1991; selected by coaches since.  In 2011, the award was renamed the Rimington–Pace Offensive Lineman of the Year Award, in honor of Nebraska's Dave Rimington and Ohio State's Orlando Pace.

 1984: Jeff Dellenbach, G,  Wisconsin
 1985: Mike Haight, T, Iowa
 1986: Dave Croston, G, Iowa
 1987: Tony Mandarich, T, Michigan State
 1988: Tony Mandarich, T, Michigan State (2)
 1989: Bob Kula, T, Michigan State
 1990: no award
 1991: Greg Skrepenak, T, Michigan
 1992: Mike Devlin, C, Iowa
 1993: Korey Stringer, T, Ohio State
 1994: Korey Stringer, T, Ohio State (2)
 1995: Orlando Pace, T, Ohio State
 1996: Orlando Pace, T, Ohio State (2)
 1997: Flozell Adams, T, Michigan State
 1998: Jon Jansen, T, Michigan
 1999: Chris McIntosh,  T, Wisconsin
 2000: Steve Hutchinson, G, Michigan
 2001: LeCharles Bentley, C, Ohio State
 2002: Eric Steinbach, OL, Iowa
 2003: Robert Gallery, T, Iowa
 2004: David Baas, C, Michigan
 2005: Greg Eslinger, C, Minnesota
 2006: Jake Long, T, Michigan
 2007: Jake Long, T, Michigan (2)
 2008: A. Q. Shipley, C, Penn State
 2009: Bryan Bulaga, T, Iowa
 2010: Gabe Carimi, T, Wisconsin
 2011: David Molk, C, Michigan
 2012: Taylor Lewan, T, Michigan
 2013: Taylor Lewan, T, Michigan (2)
 2014: Brandon Scherff, T, Iowa
 2015: Taylor Decker, T, Ohio State
 2016: Pat Elflein, C, Ohio State
 2017: Billy Price, C, Ohio State
 2018: Michael Deiter, G, Wisconsin
 2019: Tristan Wirfs, T, Iowa
 2020: Wyatt Davis, G, Ohio State
 2021: Tyler Linderbaum, C, Iowa
 2022: Peter Skoronski, T, Northwestern

Defensive

Smith–Brown Defensive Lineman of the Year
Selected by Big Ten radio broadcasters until 1991; selected by coaches since.  In 2011, the award was renamed the Smith–Brown Defensive Lineman of the Year Award in honor of Michigan State's Bubba Smith and Penn State's Courtney Brown.
 1984: Paul Hufford, T, Iowa
 1985: Mike Hammerstein, T, Michigan
 1986: Eric Kumerow, OLB, Ohio State
 1987: Dave Haight, NG, Iowa
 1988: Mark Messner, T, Michigan
 1989: Moe Gardner, NT, Illinois
 1990: no award
 1991: Leroy Smith, DE, Iowa
 1992: Chris Hutchinson, DL, Michigan
 1993: Dan Wilkinson, T, Ohio State
 1994: Simeon Rice, DE, Illinois
 1995: Mike Vrabel, DE, Ohio State
 1996: Mike Vrabel, DE, Ohio State (2)
 1997: Jared DeVries, DL, Iowa
 1998: Tom Burke, DL, Wisconsin
 1999: Courtney Brown, DE, Penn State
 2000: Wendell Bryant, DL, Wisconsin and Karon Riley, DE, Minnesota
 2001: Wendell Bryant, DL, Wisconsin (2)
 2002: Jimmy Kennedy, DT, Penn State
 2003: Will Smith, DE, Ohio State
 2004: Erasmus James, DE, Wisconsin
 2005: Tamba Hali, DE, Penn State
 2006: LaMarr Woodley, DE, Michigan
 2007: Vernon Gholston, DE, Ohio State
 2008: Mitch King, DT, Iowa
 2009: Jared Odrick, DT, Penn State
 2010: Ryan Kerrigan, DE, Purdue
 2011: Devon Still, DT, Penn State
 2012: John Simon, DE, Ohio State
 2013: Shilique Calhoun, DE, Michigan State
 2014: Joey Bosa, DE, Ohio State
 2015: Joey Bosa, DE, Ohio State (2)
 2016: Tyquan Lewis, DE, Ohio State
 2017: Nick Bosa, DE, Ohio State
 2018: Kenny Willekes, DE, Michigan State
 2019: Chase Young, DE, Ohio State
 2020: Daviyon Nixon, DT, Iowa
 2021: Aidan Hutchinson, DE, Michigan
 2022: Mike Morris, DE, Michigan

Butkus–Fitzgerald Linebacker of the Year
Award started in 2011, named in honor of Illinois' Dick Butkus and Northwestern's Pat Fitzgerald.
 2011: Lavonte David, Nebraska
 2012: Michael Mauti, Penn State
 2013: Chris Borland, Wisconsin
 2014: Mike Hull, Penn State
 2015: Joe Schobert, Wisconsin
 2016: Jabrill Peppers, Michigan
 2017: Josey Jewell, Iowa
 2018: Devin Bush, Michigan
 2019: Micah Parsons, Penn State
 2020: Paddy Fisher, Northwestern
 2021: Leo Chenal, Wisconsin
 2022: Jack Campbell, Iowa

Tatum–Woodson Defensive Back of the Year
Award started in 2011, named in honor of Ohio State's Jack Tatum and Purdue's Rod Woodson.
 2011: Alfonzo Dennard, CB, Nebraska
 2012: Micah Hyde, CB, Iowa
 2013: Darqueze Dennard, CB, Michigan State
 2014: Kurtis Drummond, S, Michigan State
 2015: Desmond King, CB, Iowa
 2016: Jourdan Lewis, CB, Michigan
 2017: Josh Jackson, CB, Iowa
 2018: Amani Hooker, S, Iowa
 2019: Antoine Winfield Jr., S, Minnesota
 2020: Shaun Wade, CB, Ohio State
 2021: Riley Moss, CB, Iowa
 2022: Devon Witherspoon, CB, Illinois

Special teams

Bakken–Andersen Kicker of the Year
Named in honor of Wisconsin's Jim Bakken and Michigan State's Morten Andersen.
 2011: Brett Maher, Nebraska
 2012: Brett Maher, Nebraska (2) and Jeff Budzien, Northwestern
 2013: Jeff Budzien, Northwestern (2)
 2014: Brad Craddock, Maryland
 2015: Griffin Oakes, Indiana
 2016: Emmit Carpenter, Minnesota
 2017: Griffin Oakes, Indiana (2)
 2018: Chase McLaughlin, Illinois
 2019: Keith Duncan, Iowa
 2020: Connor Culp, Nebraska
 2021: Jake Moody, Michigan
 2022: Jake Moody, Michigan (2)

Eddleman–Fields Punter of the Year
Named in honor of Illinois' Dwight Eddleman and Michigan State's Brandon Fields.
 2011: Brett Maher, Nebraska
 2012: Will Hagerup, Michigan
 2013: Cody Webster, Purdue
 2014: Peter Mortell, Minnesota
 2015: Sam Foltz, Nebraska
 2016: Cameron Johnston, Ohio State
 2017: Ryan Anderson, Rutgers
 2018: Will Hart, Michigan
 2019: Blake Hayes, Illinois
 2020: Tory Taylor, Iowa
 2021: Jordan Stout, Penn State
 2022: Bryce Baringer, Michigan State

Rodgers–Dwight Return Specialist of the Year
Named in honor of Nebraska's Johnny Rodgers and Iowa's Tim Dwight.
 2015: William Likely, Maryland
 2016: Jabrill Peppers, Michigan
 2017: Saquon Barkley, Penn State
 2018: Ihmir Smith-Marsette, Iowa
 2019: Javon Leake, Maryland
 2020: Aron Cruickshank, Rutgers
 2021: Charlie Jones, Iowa
 2022: Jaylin Lucas, Indiana

See also
Chicago Tribune Silver Football

References

College football conference awards and honors
Individual Honors